Fujisawa (written: 藤沢 or 藤澤) is a Japanese surname. Notable people with the surname include:

Hideki Fujisawa, Japanese musician
Hideyuki Fujisawa, also known as Shuko Fujisawa, Japanese professional Go player
Hosai Fujisawa, born as Kuranosuke Fujisawa, professional Go player
, Japanese racewalker
Kazuo Fujisawa, trainer of race horses
Mamoru Fujisawa, composer and director
, Japanese chief executive
Norimasa Fujisawa (藤澤 ノリマサ born 1983), Japanese Singer, composer and Pianist
Rikitaro Fujisawa, Japanese mathematician
Rina Fujisawa, Japanese professional Go player, granddaughter of Hideyuki Fujisawa
Ryoichi Fujisawa, former Japanese Nordic skier
Satsuki Fujisawa, Japanese curler
Shu Fujisawa Japanese author
Shuhei Fujisawa, Japanese author
Takashi Fujisawa, Japanese ski jumper
Takeo Fujisawa, Japanese businessman who worked for Honda
Tooru Fujisawa, Japanese manga author
Yukiko Fujisawa, Japanese figure skater

Japanese-language surnames